Lauromacromia is a genus of dragonfly in the family Corduliidae, which are found in South America. The genus has been created in 1970 by Dirk Geijskes.

Species
The genus Lauromacromia includes the following species:

References

Corduliidae
Odonata of South America
Insects described in 1970